Carlos Contreras (born 6 September 1991) is a Honduran footballer who plays as a midfielder

Career

College & Youth
Contreras began playing college soccer at University of Wisconsin–Parkside in 2010 and 2011.

After college, Contreras appeared for NPSL side Minnesota United FC Reserves in 2014.

Professional
Contreras signed with USL club Colorado Springs Switchbacks on 26 January 2015.

References

1991 births
Living people
Association football midfielders
Honduran footballers
Soccer players from Minnesota
Expatriate soccer players in the United States
USL Championship players
Major Arena Soccer League players
Colorado Springs Switchbacks FC players
St. Louis Ambush (2013–) players
Milwaukee Wave players
Wisconsin–Parkside Rangers men's soccer players
National Premier Soccer League players
People from Stillwater, Minnesota
Sportspeople from the Minneapolis–Saint Paul metropolitan area
FC Wichita players